Mycoblastus is a genus of crustose lichens in the family Tephromelataceae. Members of the genus are commonly called blood lichens.

Taxonomy
The genus was circumscribed in 1852 by Johannes Musaeus Norman, who selected the widespread Mycoblastus sanguinarius as the type species. This species was one of many introduced by Carl Linnaeus in his influential 1753 work Species Plantarum, as Lichen sanguinarius. In North America this species is colloquially known as the "bloody-heart lichen".

In 1984 Josef Hafellner created the family Mycoblastaceae to contain this genus, but this family has since been placed in synonymy with the Tephromelataceae.

Description
Mycoblastus species produce a grayish-white or greenish-gray crustose thallus that contains a green algal photobiont from the genus Trebouxia. The apothecia are typically large, hemmispherical, shiny black or dark pigmented, and lack a margin. There are highly branched and anastomosing paraphyses that form a network around the asci. The asci are lecanoralean (meaning an apothecium containing algae at least below the hypothecium and usually having a distinct amphithecium that often also contains algae) that mostly contain one or two, colorless, thick-walled ascospores.

Species
As of April 2021, Species Fungorum accepts 14 species of Mycoblastus:
Mycoblastus affinis  – temperate Northern Hemisphere
Mycoblastus alpinus  – temperate Northern Hemisphere
Mycoblastus bryophilus  – Campbell Island; Tasmania
Mycoblastus caesius  – temperate oceanic areas of the Northern Hemisphere
Mycoblastus campbellianus  – New Zealand; Tasmania; Campbell Island; Macquarie Island; Australia; Tierra del Fuego; Chile
Mycoblastus coniophorus  – Chile; Juan Fernandez; Auckland Island; Macquarie Island; Prince Edward Island; Tasmania; Australia
Mycoblastus disporus  – Tasmania; New Zealand
Mycoblastus kalioruber  – Tasmania
Mycoblastus leprarioides  – Australia
Mycoblastus oreotropicanus  – Papua New Guinea
Mycoblastus physodalicus  – Queensland, Australia
Mycoblastus sanguinarioides  – Tasmania; Australia
Mycoblastus sanguinarius  – temperate Northern Hemisphere
Mycoblastus sinensis  – China

The species once known as Mycoblastus fucatus was transferred into a new genus, Violella, circumscribed in 2011 to contain it and other similar species with Biatora-type asci and unusual pigmentation in the hymenium.

References

Lecanorales
Lecanorales genera
Lichen genera
Taxa described in 1852